The Ontario League was a Minor League Baseball league which operated in six Ontario cities in .

Teams
Brantford Red Sox (Brantford, Ontario)
Guelph Blitmores (Guelph, Ontario)
Hamilton Tigers (Hamilton, Ontario)
London Tecumsehs (London, Ontario)
St. Catharines Brewers (St. Catharines, Ontario)
St. Thomas Blue Sox (St. Thomas, Ontario)

Note: Hamilton disbanded after the first half of the season on July 3

External links
Baseball-Reference (Minors)

Defunct baseball leagues in Canada